Nicotine-derived nitrosamine ketone (NNK) is one of the key tobacco-specific nitrosamines derived from nicotine.  It plays an important role in carcinogenesis. The conversion of nicotine to NNK entails opening of the pyrrolidine ring.

Synthesis and occurrence
NNK can be produced by standard methods of organic synthesis.

Tobacco
NNK is both found in cured tobacco and is produced during its burning (pyrolysis).  The amount of NNK delivered in cigarette smoke ranged from 30 to 280 ng/cigarette in one study and 12 to 110 ng/cigarette in another.

Sun-cured tobaccos (a.k.a. "Oriental") contain very little NNK and other TSNAs due to low-nitrate soil, lack of nitrate fertilizer, and sun-curing. Flue-cured tobacco (a.k.a. "Virginia" tobacco), especially when using an open flame, contains most of the NNK in American blended tobaccos although Marlboro's "virginia blend" had the lowest levels of NNK per nicotine out of many tested with the exception of Natural American Spirit.

e-Cigarettes
e-Cigarette do not convert nicotine to NNK due to their lower operating temperatures.  The amount of NNK delivered by e-cigarettes reaches 2.8 ng per 15 puffs (approximately 1 cigarette).
NNK was found in 89% of Korean e-cigarette liquids. Concentrations range from 0.22 to 9.84 µg/L. For the product that had the highest amount, if 1 ml is equival to 20 cigarettes, there would be 9.84/20 = 0.5 ng NNK per e-cig cigarette dose.  Cigarettes with 1 gram of tobacco average about 350 ng.

Biology

Metabolism 
NNK is initially a procarcinogen that needs activation to exert its effects. The activation of NNK is done by enzymes of the cytochrome pigment (CYP) multigene family. These enzymes catalyze hydroxylation reactions. Beside the CYP family NNK can also be activated by metabolic genes, like myeloperoxidase (MPO) and epoxide hydrolase (EPHX1).
NNK can be activated by two different routes, the oxidative path and the reductive path. In the oxidative metabolism NNK undergoes an α-hydroxylation catalyzed by cytochrome P450. This reaction can be done by two pathways namely by  α-methylhydroxylation or by α-methylenehydroxylation. Both pathways produce the carcinogenic metabolized isoform of NNK, NNAL.

In the reductive metabolism NNK undergoes either a carbonyl reduction or a pyridine N-oxidation, both producing NNAL.

NNAL can be detoxified by glucuronidation producing a non-carcinogenic compounds known as NNAL-Glucs. The glucuronidation can take place on the oxygen next to the ring (NNAL-O-Gluc), or it takes place on the nitrogen inside the ring(NNAL-N-Gluc). The NNAL-Glucs are then excreted by the kidneys into the urine.

Signaling pathways 
Once NNK is activated, NNK initiates a cascade of signaling pathways (for example ERK1/2, NFκB, PI3K/Akt,  MAPK, FasL, K-ras), resulting in uncontrolled cellular proliferation and tumorigenesis.

NNK activates µ en m-calpain kinase which induce lung metastasis via the ERK1/2 pathway. This pathway upregulate cellular myelocytomatosis (c-Myc) and B cell leukemia/lymphoma 2 (Bcl2) in which the two oncoprotein are involved in cellular proliferation, transformation and apoptosis. Also does NNK promotes cell survival via phosphorylation with cooperation of c-Myc and Bcl2 causing cellular migration, invasion and uncontrolled proliferation.

The ERK1/2 pathway also phosphorylate NFκB causing an upregulation of  cyclin D1, a G1 phase regulator protein. When NNK is present it directly involves cellular survival dependent on NFκB. Further studies are needed to better understand NNK cellular pathways of NFκB.

The phosphoinositide 3-kinase (PI3K/Akt) pathway is also an important contributor to NNK-induced cellular transformations and metastasis. This process ensures the proliferation and survival of tumorigenic cells.
The ERK1/2 and Akt pathways show consequential changes in levels of protein expression as a result of NNK-activation in the cells, but further research is needed to fully understand  the mechanism of NNK-activated pathways.

Pathology

Toxicity 
NNK is known as a mutagen, which means it causes polymorphisms in the human genome. Studies showed that NNK induced gene polymorphisms in cells that involve in cell growth, proliferation and differentiation.
There are multiple NNK dependent routes that involve cell proliferation. One example is the cell route that coordinates the downregulation of retinoic acid receptor beta (RAR-β). Studies showed that with a 100 mg/kg dose of NNK, several point mutations were formed in the RAR-β gene, inducing tumorigenesis in the lungs.

Other genes affected by NNK include sulfotransferase 1A1 (SULT1A1), transforming growth factor beta (TGF-β), and angiotensin II (AT2).

NNK plays a very important role in gene silencing, modification, and functional disruption which induce carcinogenesis.

Inhibition 
Chemical compounds derived from cruciferous vegetables and EGCG inhibit lung tumorigenesis by NNK in animal models.  Whether these effects have any relevance to human health is unknown and is a subject of ongoing research.

See also  
 Toxification

References

External links 
 MSDS

Nitrosamines
3-Pyridyl compounds
IARC Group 1 carcinogens
Aromatic ketones